On June 18, 2004, a massive suicide car bombing near the New Iraqi Army recruitment center in Baghdad killed 35 civilians and wounded 145.

None of the 175 would-be recruits or active U.S. and Iraqi servicemen were hurt in the attack for which Jama'at al-Tawhid wal-Jihad was blamed.

See also 
 List of terrorist incidents, 2004
 Terrorism in Iraq

External links
Death toll rises after Baghdad car bomb ABC
Car bomb kills 35 in Baghdad CNN

2004 murders in Iraq
21st-century mass murder in Iraq
Mass murder in 2004
Suicide car and truck bombings in Iraq
Suicide bombings in Baghdad
Terrorist incidents in Iraq in 2004
2000s in Baghdad
Terrorist incidents in Baghdad
Terrorist attacks attributed to al-Qaeda in Iraq
Attacks on buildings and structures in Iraq